Robert Ayling (dates unknown) was an English cricketer who made two appearances in first-class cricket matches in 1796, both for Kent sides against teams from Middlesex. He scored a total of 22 runs in his four innings, with a highest score of 11.

He is known to have played for Woolwich Cricket Club in a match in 1806 against MCC at Lord's Old Ground and for a 23-man Kent side in an odds match in 1807 against an England side at Penenden Heath. William Ayling, who was possibly his brother, played in both of these matches on the same side.

Notes

References

English cricketers of 1787 to 1825
Kent cricketers
Year of birth unknown
Year of death unknown
English cricketers